Daniel Mark Epstein (born October 25, 1948) is an American poet, dramatist, and biographer. His poetry has been noted for its erotic and spiritual lyricism, as well as its power—in several dramatic monologues—in capturing crucial moments of American history. While he has continued to publish poetry he is more widely known for his biographies of Nat King Cole, Edna St. Vincent Millay, Bob Dylan and Abraham Lincoln, and his radio plays, "Star of Wonder," and "The Two Menorahs," which have become holiday mainstays on National Public Radio.

Early life

Daniel Mark Epstein was born in Washington D.C., the son of businessman Donald David Epstein, and Louise Tillman, a homemaker. His younger sister is the journalist Linda Stevens. Epstein grew up in West Hyattsville, Maryland, suburban Washington, and his mother's home town of Vienna on the Eastern Shore of Maryland. Many of his poems, plays, and short stories are inspired by life in Dorchester County and Vienna in the mid-twentieth century. He began writing poetry when he was in grade school. Some poems he wrote in his early teens came to the attention of Elliot Coleman, the legendary founder of the Writing Seminars at Johns Hopkins University. Coleman invited him to Baltimore, and offered advice and encouragement. Epstein was educated in the public schools of Prince George's County and at Kenyon College where he worked with poet John Crowe Ransom, graduating with Highest Honors in English in the 1970s. He briefly attended graduate school at the University of Virginia with the support of a Woodrow Wilson and Danforth Foundation grant, but left after a semester to pursue a career as a writer.

1970s

Epstein quickly established his reputation as a poet in the early 1970s by publishing poems in The New Yorker, The Nation, The Kenyon Review, and other prominent journals. These were collected in the volume No Vacancies in Hell, published by Liveright in 1973. The success of this first book, a second book of poems titled The Follies, and his verse drama Jenny and the Phoenix, produced at the Baltimore Theatre Project in 1977, drew the attention of the American Academy of Arts and Letters. They awarded Epstein the Prix de Rome (Rome Prize) that year. 
 
During his fellowship at the American Academy in Rome he wrote more verse drama as well as many of the poems that would be included in The Book of Fortune, published in 1982. While Epstein was still in Italy his third book, Young Men's Gold, was published to wide acclaim, one critic calling the title poem "quite possibly the best long poem since Ginsberg's 'Howl' " and the reviewer from The New Republic comparing the love poems to those of John Donne. He returned to America in 1979 as one of the most widely read poets of his generation. He was soon under contract to the Keedick agency for a speaking tour, with Oxford University Press to translate Euripides, and accepted a position as visiting Assistant Professor at Johns Hopkins University. Jenny and the Phoenix was optioned by Joseph Papp for production at The Public Theatre in New York. In Baltimore he became active in a vibrant poetry scene that included such poets as Lucille Clifton, Anselm Hollo, Andrei Codrescu, and David Franks.

1980s

Epstein taught poetry and playwriting at the Johns Hopkins Seminars until 1982. While he continued teaching part time, at Randolph Macon, Towson State University, and The Maryland College Institute of Art, his ongoing work in the theatre and a contract to write a textbook for D.C. Heath made an academic career impractical. The failure of Epstein's Off-Broadway play The Midnight Visitor in 1981 darkened his prospects as a playwright. In the mid-eighties he began publishing prose essays and short stories that were popularly syndicated and anthologized. The first of these, "Star of Wonder", about a boy whose parents insist upon celebrating both Hanukah and Christmas inspired hundreds of passionate letters in a dozen city newspapers when it first appeared in syndication. Later broadcast yearly on NPR's All Things Considered, it became one of the best known holiday stories since "A Christmas Carol". 
 
"Star of Wonder" is the title story of a collection of holiday tales published in 1986. On the strength of that book the author secured a two-book contract with Addison and Wesley: To Write an Autobiography, Love's Compass, and a biography of the evangelist Aimee Semple McPherson, Sister Aimee. The publication of these books, the first in 1990 and the second in 1993, offered the poet a chance at a second career, as a biographer and historian.

1990s

While much of Epstein's best poetry was published in the 1980s and 1990s (Spirits, The Boy in the Well) his poetry has been eclipsed by the success of the biographies of Sister Aimee, Nat King Cole, and Edna St. Vincent Millay. Epstein was welcomed as a sympathetic and fair biographer, with an instinct for the fine detail and historical milieu; his biographies are considered in some cases definitive, but in all cases important contributions to American studies. Critics sometimes challenge the biographer's premises. Eric Foner, in The Washington Post, praised Lincoln and Whitman for its "revealing character study of Whitman and a penetrating analysis of his wartime poetry," but questioned the poet's influence on Lincoln's prose. All of these books were reviewed in the major media—the Nat King Cole biography on the cover of The New York Times Book Review section—and have remained in print through multiple editions. During this decade, as in the 1980s, Epstein contributed a number of book reviews to The New York Times, The Wall Street Journal, The Philadelphia Inquirer, and other newspapers. He also published translations of Plautus's Trinummus from the Latin, and Euripides' The Bacchae from the Greek.

2000–2010

Most of this period was devoted to the writing of a trilogy of books about Abraham Lincoln. Lincoln and Whitman (2004), a dual biography of the poet and the president was praised by The New Yorker and The Wall Street Journal for its "natural sense of detail and period" and its "passionate vividness." The Lincolns: Portrait of a Marriage (2008) was named one of the ten best books of the year by the Chicago Sun Times and The Wall Street Journal, whose reviewer remarked it "may be the best Lincoln book in a generation." Epstein's short book on Lincoln's private secretaries, Lincoln's Men, was published the following year.

2011–present

An amateur musician, the writer returned to the subject of music, and his life-long passion for folk music in particular, to write the biography of Bob Dylan on the occasion of the folk rock idol's seventieth birthday. Published in 2011 it was the first of Epstein's books to reach an extensive international audience, in editions published in English, French, Italian, Portuguese, and other languages. 

For many years Epstein was researching and writing a book about Benjamin Franklin's relationship with his son William, the last royal governor of New Jersey. The Loyal Son: The War in Ben Franklin's House (Ballantine/Random House) was finally published in 2018. The reviewer in the Wall Street Journal wrote that “The history of loyalist William Franklin and his famous father has been told before but not as fully or as well as it is by Daniel Mark Epstein in The Loyal Son. Mr. Epstein, a biographer and poet, has done a lot of fresh research and invests his narrative with literary grace and judicious sympathy for both father and son. . . . " In a starred review in Kirkus, the critic said: “A gripping history of a family torn apart by political upheaval . . . Drawing on much unpublished correspondence as well as published works, the author constructs a fast-paced, vivid narrative with a host of characters whose appearance and personality he etches with deft concision. . . . A perceptive, gritty portrayal of the frenzy of war and a father and son caught at its tumultuous center.”

Dawn to Twilight: New and Selected Poems 1967-2014 was published by Louisiana State University Press in 2015. The book achieved international acclaim when it was published in Italy as Dall'alba al crepuscolo (Raffaelli Editore, Rimini, 2020) translated by Simone Dubrovic. The critic in Italy's most prominent newspaper Corriere della Sera, Daniele Piccini wrote: "The art of American poet Daniel Mark Epstein was born mature.... The crystalline voice of things that arises out of his verses--always chiselled and metrically refined--becomes one with the poet's reflection on the fate of human beings." The Italian translation of “Water Lillies,” from Epstein's sequence “Homage to Mallarme,”  inspired the harp sonata “Le Ninfee,” by Harpist Emanuela Battigelli. The new work was recorded on Battigelli’s CD Le Ninfee (Artesuono, 2020).

In April of 2020 Epstein composed a cycle of sonnets "written in ten days from April 5-15, during the first shelter-in-place orders of the coronavirus pandemic...that explore the themes of isolation, danger, and the strangeness of our new reality," in his own words. The poems became the text for a film titled Cruel April: Poems from the Pandemic, directed by Douglas Trapp and starring actors Tyne Daly, Jennifer Van Dyck, Paul Hecht, and Harris Yulin. The actors recite the poems over a montage of art and photography from the Tivoli Gallery, New York. The short film may be viewed online.

In March of 2022 Yale University Press published Rapture and Melancholy, Epstein's edition of Edna St. Vincent Millay's diaries with an introduction and extensive commentary. "Seven decades after Millay's death," said the New York Times, Rapture and Melancholy paints a picture of artistic triumph, romantic tumult, and a daily life that descended into addiction."  Abigail Deutch, writing in the Wall Street Journal, wrote: “Rapture and Melancholy... provides an occasion to revisit not just Millay's improbable life but also her sometimes revelatory work. . . . While the diary entries vary widely in interest level, Epstein’s biographical summations are reliably fascinating and informative. . . . "

In an interview with Mara Meisel of the Pittsburgh Press in 1984 Epstein said: "I always had confidence that poetry was the most important thing in my life…No great poet has not had an extraordinary command of the language, all of history and the manners and morals of his age. How are you going to say something that's going to be significant to people if you aren't well-grounded in history and in a broad sense of human nature?"
In April of 2022 the poet received an Honorary Doctorate of Letters degree from Kenyon College.

Personal life

In 1976 he was married to Wendy Roberts. They had two children, Johanna Ruth Epstein and Benjamin Robert Epstein. They were divorced in 1993. Epstein married Jennifer Bishop in 1993, and they had two sons, Theodore John and Nathaniel David Epstein. Epstein and Bishop were divorced in 2012. Since the early 1970s Epstein has been an active member of B'nai Israel Synagogue in Baltimore.

Books

 No Vacancies In Hell (poetry) Liveright/Norton, 1973
 The Follies (poetry) Overlook/Viking Press, 1977
 Young Men's Gold (poetry) Overlook/Viking Press, 1978
 The Book of Fortune (poetry) Overlook/Viking Press, 1982
 Star of Wonder (stories and essays) Overlook/Viking 1986
 Spirits (poetry) Overlook/Viking 1987
 Love's Compass (essays) Addison-Wesley, 1989
 Sister Aimee: the Life of Aimee Semple McPherson, Harcourt Brace, 1993
 The Trinummus of Plautus (translation) Johns Hopkins University Press, 1994
 The Boy in the Well (poetry) Overlook/Viking, 1995
 The Bacchae of Euripides (translation) University of Pennsylvania Press, 1997
 Nat King Cole (biography) Farrar, Straus and Giroux, 1999
 What Lips My Lips Have Kissed: Life of Edna St. Vincent Millay Holt, 2001
 The Traveler's Calendar (poetry) Overlook/Penguin Putnam, 2002
 Lincoln and Whitman: Parallel Lives in Civil War Washington, Random House, 2004
 The Lincolns: Portrait of a Marriage, Ballantine/Random House, 2004
 Literary Genius: 25 Classic Writers Who Define English & American Literature, Paul Dry Books, 2007 (Illustrated by Barry Moser)
 The Glass House: New Poems, LSU Press, 2009
 Lincoln's Men: The President and His Private Secretaries, HarperCollins, 2009
 The Ballad of Bob Dylan, Harper, 2011
 Dawn to Twilight: New and Selected Poems, Louisiana State University Press, 2015
 The Loyal Son: The War in Ben Franklin's House, Ballantine/Random House, 2018
 Rapture and Melancholy: The Diaries of Edna St. Vincent Millay, Yale University Press, 2022

Magazines (poems published in)

 The American Scholar 
 The Atlantic Monthly
 The Hudson Review
 The Kenyon Review
 The Michigan Quarterly
 The Nation
 The New Criterion
 The New Republic
 The New Yorker
 The North American Review
 The Paris Review
 Poetry Magazine
 The Virginia Quarterly, et al.Fellowships

 Woodrow Wilson Fellowship (Individual Study Grant), 1971 
 Danforth Fellowship, University of Virginia, 1971  
 National Endowment for the Arts, Fellowship in Poetry, 1974
 Guggenheim Fellowship, 1984
 Richard L. Thomas Chair in Creative Writing, Kenyon College, 2012 
 Patrick Henry Fellowship, 2014

Awards

 Prix de Rome, The American Academy and National Institute of Arts and Letters, 1978
 Emily Clark Balch Award, for best poem of 1981, from The Virginia Quarterly, 1981 
 The New York Times Notable Book, for Nat King Cole, 1999
 New York Public Library Honoree, "Books to Remember" for What Lips My Lips Have Kissed'', 2001 
 Maryland Library Association's Author of the Year, 2002
 Academy Award for Lifetime Achievement, American Academy of Arts and Letters, 2006

References

1948 births
American biographers
American male biographers
American male poets
Kenyon College alumni
Poets from Washington, D.C.
Living people
Translators of Ancient Greek texts